Bob Soccer School FC is a football team based in Santo Domingo, Dominican Republic. the team represent the academy of football Bob Soccer School and Currently playing in the Primera División de Republica Dominicana.

Stadium

Currently the team plays at the 27.000 capacity Estadio Olímpico Félix Sánchez.

External links

Football clubs in the Dominican Republic